Glasper is a surname. Notable people with the surname include:

Robert Glasper (born 1978), American jazz pianist
Ryan Glasper (born 1985), Canadian and American football player
Tyre Glasper (born 1987), American football player

See also
Gasper (name)